Solar TV (stylized as SOLARtv) was the flagship television network of Solar Entertainment Corporation's television arm subsidiary Solar TV Network, Inc., which is the replacement of C/S 9. This was the revival of the former Solar channel Solar USA.

History
The channel launched on November 29, 2009, at 11:00am with a slogan It's A Bright New World on RPN.

On October 31, 2010, it changed some of its programming content to English/Tagalog with a new slogan Kung Saan Lahat Panalo!.

It ended its broadcast on February 25, 2011, as Solar Entertainment buys RPN and programming of ETC was transferred to RPN but will remain as a corporate brand of television arm subsidiary of Solar (now a subsidiary of ALC Group of Companies since August 23, 2014).

Programs
America's Best Dance Crew
America's Got Talent
Ben 10 Alien Force (Also Aired on GTV)
Burn Notice
Entertainment Tonight
Eureka
Fringe
Hatol ng Bayan Auto Vote 2010
Heroes
Home Shopping Network
Human Target
Jai Alai Cagayan
Super Robot Monkey Team Hyperforce Go!
Kamen Rider Dragon Knight (Also Aired on Cartoon Network Philippines)
Law & Order: Special Victims Unit
Lie to Me
The Main Event
Minute to Win It
NBA
NBC Nightly News
NCIS
One Morning Cafe
Queer Eye for the Straight Guy
PBA on Solar TV
Real NBA
Saved by the Bell
Solar's Big Ticket
RPN NewsWatch
RPN NewsCap
RPN NewsWatch Update
Survivor
Survivor: Nicaragua
The Biggest Loser
The Ellen DeGeneres Show
The Insider
The Jerry Springer Show
The Price is Right
The Real Housewives of New Jersey
The Vampire Diaries
Versus
World Class Boxing
World's Most Amazing Videos
WWE Raw (one-hour edition)
WWE Smackdown (one-hour edition)

External links

Defunct television networks in the Philippines
Radio Philippines Network
Former Solar Entertainment Corporation channels
Television channels and stations established in 2009
Television channels and stations disestablished in 2011
English-language television stations in the Philippines